Guttorm Guttormsen (born 28 June 1950) is a Norwegian Jazz musician (flute, clarinet, alto saxophone), arranger and composer.

Career 
Guttormsen was born in Mo i Rana. After moving to Oslo (1969), he appeared with Ivar Antonsen's Band at «Festspillene i Nord-Norge» (1971). Later, at Skien, he led a big band, and led his own quintet with, among others, Bjørn Kjellemyr with a series of recordings. He attended Kongsberg Jazzfestival several times, also with his own quartet (1975, 1979), and «Guttorm Guttormsen/Per Kristian Ekholt Big Band» (1976). He led his own Quintet, including with Lars Klevstrand, Jon Balke, Carl Morten Iversen, Espen Rud, releasing the album Høysang (1978).

Musical Director of «Teater Ibsen» and within Jon Eberson Quartet, Per Husby dedication orchestra (1984–1988) and contributed on albums by «Trio de Janeiro», and the release Distant Reports (2001) by «Nordnorsk Jazzforum».

He is best known for his compositions for theater, including a variety of performances at Nationaltheatret, «Det Norske Teater» and «Teater Ibsen» where he is music director.

He was also the director of "Ibsens Gåte" in 1997 which was a musical interpretation of Ibsen.

Guttormsen has composed music for a number of  Norwegian artists like Anne Grimstad Fjeld, Agnes Buen Garnås, Knut Buen, Lars Vik (Fritjof Fomlesen), Kine Hellebust to mention some. He has been a studio musician for a number of Norwegian music productions and artists like Lars Klevstrand.

He lives in Langesund since 1993.

Honors 
Buddyprisen 1979
«Rana kommunes kulturpris» 1987
«Telemark fylkes kulturpris» 1989
«Hydroprisen» 1990
«Skien bys medal» 1991
«Bamble kommunes kulturpris» 2001
«GS Bankens tiltakspris» 2001

Other
«Bamble kommunes restaureringspris » 2004 with his wife Elisabeth Guttormsen

Discography

Solo albums 
 Soturnudi (MAI, 1975), with Brynjulf Blix, Carl Morten Iversen & Espen Rud

As band leader 
 Albufeira, Guttorm Guttormsen Kvartett, 1979
 10år, Guttormsen/Ekholt Storband, 1980
 Both albums were re-released in 2008, in remastered editions.

Collaborative works 
 Høysang, Guttorm Guttormsen and Lars Klevstrand, 1977
 Riv ned gjerdene),Guttorm Guttormsen and Lars Klevstrand,1976

Produsent
 Samme jord Kine Hellebust, 1993

Composistions

Theater 
According to aintervju på Riksteaterets sider Guttormsen has composed music for more than 200 plays.

 Draumens hjarte, Grenland Friteater, 2004
 No Doctor for the Dead, Grenland Friteater, 2004
 Peer Gynt i Grenland, Grenland Friteater, Teater Ibsen og Kinesiske dansere, 2004
 Peer Gynt (培尔·金特), Grenland Friteater, Teater Ibsen og Fan Theatre, 2004, som 顾特姆·顾特姆森
 Salome, New Theater, Yale U., New Haven, Connecticut, USA, 2003
 Peer Gynt, Grenland Friteater og Teater Ibsen, 2003 (På oppdrag for Mo Hornmusikk arranger for janitsjarkorps i 2007)
 1900. Maskespill og Maskefall, Den Nationale Scene, 2002
 Gullhjelmen, Teater Ibsen, 2002
 Harde tak, Grenland Friteater, 2002?
 Pinocchio, Det Norske Teatret, 2001
 Ole Brumm, Centralteateret, 2001
 Å være død er for lettvint, Grenland Friteater, 2001
 Fomlesens ferie, Grenland Friteater, 2000
 Dopa Lax, Grenland Friteater, ????
 Gode tider - for de onde, Grenland Friteater, ????
 Den innbildt syke, Grenland Friteater, 1999
 Høyt sill, Grenland Friteater og Riksteatret, 1999
 Riksgjøglerne, Grenland Friteater og Riksteatret, 1999
 Goldbergvariasjoner, Nationaltheatret, 1997
 En rosenkål for mye, Grenland Friteater (1996)
 Slangehud, Nationaltheatret, 1995
 Smuglere, Grenland Friteater, 1995
 Kirsebærtreet blomstrer i mai, Nationaltheatret, 1995
 Blue is the Smoke of War, Grenland Friteater, 1994
 Naar vi døde vaagner, Nationaltheatret, 1994
 Sarah Bernhardt, Nationaltheatret, 1987
 Jomfruer - Eller lengselsens geografi, Nationaltheatret, 1986
 Trojanerrinner, Nationaltheatret, 1984
 Det er ikke mitt bord, Den Nationale Scene, 1978

Musicals 
 Musikken berget i det blå, Teater Ibsen, 2005
 Predikanten, Teater Ibsen, 2004
 Billenes Bryllup, Telemark Kammerorkester, 2001

Operas 
 Fævlane Veit - en bakgårds opera Grenland friteater, 2005-2007
 Olaf Liljekrans, Teater Ibsen, 1983

Film
 Frihetens Pris , Terje Bomann-Larsen, 1989

Plays 
 Marispelet, Styret for Marispelet, 2005-

Concerts 
Jazz ved Havet, 2006

References

External links 
Biografi fra Jazzbasen.no (in English)
Biografi fra Musikkinformasjonssenterets nettavis "Ballade"

Norwegian jazz saxophonists
Norwegian jazz flautists
Norwegian jazz clarinetists
Musicians from Mo i Rana
1950 births
Living people
21st-century saxophonists
21st-century clarinetists
People from Bamble
21st-century flautists